Oct or OCT may refer to:

Biology and medicine 
 Optical coherence tomography, an imaging method
 Organic cation transport protein, a type of protein
 Optimal cutting temperature compound, used in histology
 Oncology clinical trial, a clinical trial in cancer research
 Oxytocin challenge test, a type of contraction stress test in late stage pregnancy
 Obsessive compulsive tendencies, a criterion involved in the diagnosis of obsessive-compulsive disorder

Mathematics 
 Octal, abbreviated oct, the base-8 number system
 Octahedron, sometimes abbreviated oct, a regular polyhedron
 Odd cycle transversal, a concept in graph theory

Science and technology 
 Octave, symbol: oct., a unit of measurement in electronics
 Octans, abbreviation: Oct, a constellation
 Office of the Chief Technologist, a manager at the NASA Institute for Advanced Concepts
 Optical coherence tomography, an imaging method
 Olefin conversion technology, a method in industrial chemistry
 Office Customisation Tool, available in some versions of Microsoft Office 2007

Chinese places and companies 
 Overseas Chinese Town, (narrowly) a theme park or (broadly) an area in Shenzhen
 OCT Tower, a skyscraper in Overseas Chinese Town
 Overseas Chinese Town Limited, a company
OCT Harbour, a retail development in Shenzhen

Other uses 
 Oct., an abbreviation for the month of October
 Ontario Certified Teacher, a professional designation
 Orangi Charitable Trust, a Pakistani microfinance organisation
 Orion correlation theory, a fringe theory in Egyptology
 Overseas countries and territories, special territories in relation to the European Union
 Oxford Classical Texts, a book series
 Oklahoma City Thunder, an American basketball team

See also 

 OTC (disambiguation)